Leonel Herrera may refer to:

 Leonel Herrera (footballer, born 1948), Chilean football centre-back
 Leonel Herrera (footballer, born 1971), Chilean football defender, son of footballer born 1948
 Leonel Torres Herrera, convicted murderer and plaintiff in the United States Supreme Court case Herrera v. Collins